The 2016 PIAA football season was the 103rd season of PIAA football in Pennsylvania. 570 high schools competed in the commonwealth playing twelve regular season games and up to four playoff games the state championship game.

Season standings

Class A

State playoff progression

A

AA

AAA

AAAA

Awards

Mr. Pennsylvania Football

Finalists Big School Class 4A-6A:
Bold indicates winner
 D'Andre Swift (RB) — St. Joseph’s Prep
 Zane Dudek (RB) — Armstrong HS
 Mark Webb (WR/CB) — Archbishop Wood HS
 Micah Parsons (RB/DE) — Harrisburg HS
 David Adams (LB) — Central Catholic

See full list of nominees for 4A-6A Mr PA Football Award Here

Finalists Small School Class 1A-3A:
Bold indicates winner
 Collin Smith (QB/DB) — Ligonier Valley HS
 Jaelen Thompson (RB) — Middletown HS
 Lamount Wade (RB/CB) — Clairton HS
 Paris Ford (WR/DB) — Steel Valley HS
 Andrew Irwin (LB/RB — Bishop Guilfoyle
See full list of nominees for 1A-3A Mr PA Football Award Here

Mr PA Football lineman award
Big School 4A-6A winner
 Joshua Lugg (RG/RT) — North Allegheny HS
Small School 1A-3A winner
 Donovan Jeter (DL — Beaver Falls HS

All-State selections

CLASS 5A

Player of the Year: Zane Dudek, Armstrong
Coach of the Year: Calvin Everett, Harrisburg

Offense

Quarterback

Kameron Patterson, Grove City – 6–3, 190 senior
Kody Kegarise, Manheim Central – 6–0, 185 senior
Grant Breneman, Cedar Cliff – 6–1, 190 senior
Yahmir Wilkerson, Harrisburg – 6–1, 200 junior
Nick Ross, West Allegheny – 6–1, 190 senior

Running Back

Zane Dudek, Armstrong – 5–10, 190 senior
Journey Brown, Meadville – 5–11, 195 senior
Shawn Thompson, Archbishop Wood – 6–0, 195 senior
Matt Garcia, Phoenixville – 5–6, 165 senior

Wide Receiver

Dez Boykin, Whitehall – 5–11, 175 junior
Jake Novak, Manheim Central – 5–11, 170 junior
Mark Webb, Archbishop Wood – 6–3, 205 senior

Tight End

A.J. Turner, Grove City – 6–2, 200 senior
Gabe Schappell, Exeter Twp. – 6–2, 220 senior

Offensive linemen

Kieran Firment, West Allegheny – 6–4, 280 senior
Chris Bleich, Wyoming Valley West – 6–6, 300 junior
Curtis Harper, McKeesport – 6–3, 293 senior
Adam Kline, Manheim Central – 6–1, 230 senior
Shaun Hastings, Cedar Cliff – 6–2, 265 senior

Athlete

Raheem Blackshear, Archbishop Wood – 5–11, 180 senior
Isaiah Manning, Meadville – 6–0, 190 junior

Specialist

D.J. Opsatnik, West Allegheny – 5–8, 150 senior

Defense

Defensive linemen

Matt Holmes, West Allegheny – 6–1, 225 senior
Micah Parsons, Harrisburg – 6–3, 230 junior
Damion Barber, Harrisburg – 6–3, 240 senior
Gunnar Royer, Manheim Central – 6–1, 210
Anthony Diodato, Archbishop Wood – 6–5, 255 senior

Linebacker

Matt Palmer, Archbishop Wood – 6–1, 205 junior
Nick Brown, Manheim Central – 5–10, 195 senior
Forrest Rhyne, Waynesboro – 6–2, 225 senior
Francis Duggan, Cedar Cliff – 6–3, 220 junior

Defensive Back

Keyshaan Husband, Central Tech – 6–0, 185 senior
Cade Robinson, Elizabethtown – 6–1, 175 junior
Ethan Laird, General McLane – 6–2, 200 senior
Jackson Buskirk, Whitehall – 6–1, 180 senior

Athlete

Joel Davis, Harrisburg – 5–9, 180 senior
Teddy Wright, Academy Park – 6–0, 200 senior

CLASS 3A

Player of the Year: Alex Hoenstine, Central Martinsburg
Coach of the Year: Ryan Matsook, Beaver Falls

Offense

Quarterback

Brycen Mussina, Montoursville – 6–4, 185 senior
Alex Smith, Keystone Oaks – 6–4, 195 senior
Darius Wise, Beaver Area – 5–11, 170 senior

Running Back

Alex Hoenstine, Central Martinsburg – 6–2, 181 senior
Chuck Carr, Hickory – 5–10, 195 senior
Jalean Thompson, Middletown – 5–10, 190 senior
Tyler Balega, Derry – 5–11, 178 senior
Ian Border, Huntingdon – 6–0, 210 junior

Wide Receiver

Tommy Shea, Montoursville – 5–10, 175 senior
Ziyon Strickland, Sharon – 5–11, 175 junior
Duane Brown, Apollo-Ridge – 6–0, 182 senior

Tight End

Mitchell Rothrock, Montoursville – 6–1, 190 senior

Offensive linemen

Crae McCracken, Loyalsock Twp. – 6–4, 275 senior
Trevor Miller, Central Martinsburg – 6–1, 245 senior
Ethan Newton, Middletown – 6–2, 250 senior
Tyler Bishop, Hickory – 6–2, 280 senior
Kyle Polishan, Scranton Prep – 6–3, 245 senior

Athlete

Marcus Williams, Loyalsock Twp. – 5–9, 185 senior
Will Gruber, Hickory – 5–10, 165 junior

Specialist

Ethan Lazorka, Montoursville – 5–9, 150 senior

Defense

Defensive linemen

Donovan Jeter, Beaver Falls – 6–5, 250 senior
Austin Heisler, Pen Argyl – 6–0, 205 senior
Peyton Snopek, Lancaster Catholic – 6–2, 230 junior
Max Borgia, Scranton Prep – 5–9, 225 senior
Justin Casey, Nanticoke Area – 6–6, 207 senior
Josh Parson, Juniata – 6–3, 260 senior

Linebacker

Hunter Webb, Loyalsock Twp. – 6–2, 200 junior
Major Jordan, North Schuylkill – 6–1, 215 senior
Hunter Landis, Middletown – 6–1, 210 senior
Trey Delbaugh, Lewisburg – 5–11, 185 senior
Jared Smith, Central Martinsburg – 6–0, 198 junior
Jesse Luketa, Mercyhurst Prep – 6–3, 218 junior

Defensive Back

De'Shaun Wilson, Wyomissing – 5–10, 160 junior
Jeff Wehler, St. Mary's – 6–1, 195 senior
Bryan Downey, Lancaster Catholic – 6–0, 185 senior

Athlete

Tyreer Mills, Middletown – 5–9, 165 junior
Jalen Simpson, Notre Dame-Green Pond – 5–11, 170 senior

CLASS 2A

Player of the Year: Elijah Parrish, Ligonier Valley
Coach of the Year:  Rod Steele, Steel Valley

Offense

Quarterback

Collin Smith, Ligonier Valley 6–1, 200 senior
Frank Antuono, Neshannock 6–2, 220 senior

Running Back

Tyler Barone, Iroquois 5–10, 190 senior 
Gaige Garcia, Southern Columbia 5–9, 180 freshmen 
A.J. Crider, South Side Beaver 6–2, 215 senior

Wide Receiver

CLASS 1A

Player of the Year: Lamont Wade, Clairton
Coach of the Year: Justin Wheeler, Bishop Guilfoyle

Offense

Quarterback

Josh Trybus, Bishop Guilfoyle – 5–10, 172 senior
Noah Hamlin, Clairton – 5–11, 160 senior
Brenden Makray, Clarion-Limestone – 6–4, 162 junior

Running Back

Braxton Chapman, Farrell – 6–1, 210 senior
Lamont Wade, Clairton – 5–9, 190 senior
Dylan Rabuck, Williams Valley – 6–0, 189 junior
Braedon St. Clair, Portage – 6–0, 190 senior
Nick Stewart, Curwensville – 6–1, 205 junior
Tylor Belles, Sayre – 6–0, 210 senior

Wide Receiver

Garrett Geresti, Avella – 6–2, 175 senior
Sam Leadbetter, Clarion-Limestone – 6–3, 162 senior
Markus Jenkins, Our Lady of Sacred Heart – 6–1, 181 senior

Offensive linemen

Nick Leamer, Bishop Guilfoyle – 6–2, 300 junior
Eric Washington, Steelton-Highspire – 6–5, 311 senior
Steven McClure, Curwensville – 6–3, 220 junior
Wandell Murray, Farrell – 6–3, 315 senior
Ian Minnich, Williams Valley – 5–10, 276 senior

Athlete

Jake Murawski, Moshannon Valley – 6–1, 175 senior
Mike Macefe, Clarion-Limestone – 5–8, 182 senior

Specialist

Kolton McGhee, Bishop Guilfoyle – 6–0, 170 sophomore

Defense

Defensive linemen

Luke Frederick, Bishop Guilfoyle – 6–5, 225 senior
Justin Kasmierski, Ridgway – 6–3, 235 senior
Devon Rabuck, Williams Valley – 6–0, 198 junior
Hunter Poust, Muncy – 6–1, 225 junior
Logan McGeary, Bishop Guilfoyle – 6–2, 290 senior
Kyle Plesh, Marian Catholic – 6–0, 249 senior

Linebacker

Andrew Irwin, Bishop Guilfoyle – 6–1, 216 senior
Dylan Wolfgang, Williams Valley – 6–1, 165 junior
Kyi Wright, Farrell – 6–3, 225 sophomore
Kaden Martell, Canton – 6–0, 215 junior
Pap Keeler, Farrell – 6–2, 230 senior

Defensive Back

Kenny Robinson, Imani Christian – 6–2, 200 senior
Neil MacDonald, Ridgway – 6–0, 172 junior
Brock Barrett, Redbank Valley – 6–0, 175 junior
Josh Porterfield, West Middlesex – 5–10, 155 senior

References

Pennsylvania Interscholastic Athletic Association